The Arafura shrikethrush (Colluricincla megarhyncha) is a species of bird in the family Pachycephalidae.

Taxonomy and systematics
This species was formerly considered a conspecific member of the little shrikethrush complex. Genetic investigations of New Guinea populations of the little shrikethrush indicated high levels of genetic divergence, suggesting it comprised more than one species.

Subspecies
Currently, three subspecies are recognized:
 C. m. megarhyncha (Quoy & Gaimard, 1832) ― found on Salawati and Misool (off northwestern New Guinea), Aru Islands (off southwestern New Guinea) and New Guinea
 C. m. parvula Gould, 1845 ― originally described as a separate species. Found in north-eastern Western Australia and northern Northern Territory (Australia)
 C. m. aruensis (Gray, GR, 1858) ― Aru Islands, Trans-Fly region of south New Guinea

Distribution and habitat
It is found in New Guinea and Australia. Its natural habitats are subtropical or tropical moist lowland forests and subtropical or tropical moist montane forests.

Behaviour and ecology
During a study of toxicity in birds, two specimens of this species were tested. One of these specimens contained traces of batrachotoxins (BTXs) similar to those found in the secretions of Central and South American poison dart frogs.

References

Arafura shrikethrush
Birds of New Guinea
Birds of Australia
Arafura shrikethrush
Arafura shrikethrush
Toxic birds